Walk the Sky 2.0 is the first EP by American rock band Alter Bridge following the studio album Walk the Sky. It was announced on September 15, 2020 and released on November 6, 2020  by Napalm Records. It includes seven tracks with one new track titled "Last Rites" and six live versions of songs from Walk the Sky.

Background
It features a new studio track, "Last Rites", written, recorded and completed entirely during the COVID-19 lockdown, and six live tracks taken from their American Victorious Sky Tour.  

.The EP was released on CD and LP, while the digital and streaming versions were released together with Walk the Sky as a deluxe bundle

Track listing

Personnel 
Alter Bridge
 Myles Kennedy – lead vocals, guitar
 Mark Tremonti – guitar, vocals
 Brian Marshall – bass guitar
 Scott Phillips – drums

Production
 Michael "Elvis" Baskette – production, mixing
 Jef Moll – engineering, digital editing
 Josh Saldate – assistance
 Brad Blackwood – mastering

References

External links
 Official band website

2020 EPs
Napalm Records EPs